A full-body scanner is a device that detects objects on or inside a person's body for security screening purposes, without physically removing clothes or making physical contact. Unlike metal detectors, full-body scanners can detect non-metal objects, which became an increasing concern after various airliner bombing attempts in the 2000s and some scanners can also detect swallowed items or hidden in body cavities of a person. Starting in 2007, full-body scanners started supplementing metal detectors at airports and train stations in many countries.

Three distinct technologies have been used in practice:
 Millimeter wave scanners use non-ionizing electromagnetic radiation similar to that used by wireless data transmitters, in the extremely high frequency (EHF) radio band (which is a lower frequency than visible light). The health risks posed by these machines are still being studied, and the evidence is mixed, though millimeter wave scanners do not generate ionizing radiation. 
 X-ray-based scanners
 Backscatter X-ray scanners use low dose radiation for detecting suspicious metallic and non-metallic objects hidden under clothing or in shoes and in the cavities of the human body. The dosage of radiation received is usually between 0.05 and 0.1 μSv Considerable debate regarding the safety of this method sparked investigations, ultimately leading multiple countries to ban the usage of them.
 Transmission X-ray scanners use higher dosage penetrating radiation which passes through the human body and then is captured by a detector or array of detectors. This type of full body scanners allows to detect objects hidden not only under the clothes, but also inside the human body (for example, drugs carried by drug couriers in the stomach) or in natural cavities. The dosage received is usually not higher than 0.25 μSv and is mainly regulated by the American radiation safety standard for personal search systems using gamma or X-ray radiation
 Infra-red thermal conductivity scanners do not use electromagnetic radiation to penetrate the body or clothing, but instead use slight temperature differences on the surface of clothing to detect the presence of foreign objects. Thermal conductivity relies on the ability of contraband hidden under clothing to heat or cool the surface of the clothing faster than the skin surface. Warm air is used to heat up the surface of the clothing. How fast the clothing cools is dependent, in part, on what is beneath it. Items that cool the clothing faster or slower than the surface of the skin will be identified by a thermal image of the clothing. These scanners are less often used compared to X-ray-based and mmWave-based scanners.

Passengers and advocates have objected to images of their naked bodies being displayed to screening agents or recorded by the government. Critics have called the imaging virtual strip searches without probable cause, and have suggested they are illegal and violate basic human rights. However, current technology is less intrusive and because of privacy issues most people are allowed to refuse this scan and opt for a traditional pat-down. Depending on the technology used, the operator may see an alternate-wavelength image of the person's naked body, merely a cartoon-like representation of the person with an indicator showing where any suspicious items were detected, or full X-ray image of the person. For privacy and security reasons, the display is generally not visible to other passengers, and in some cases is located in a separate room where the operator cannot see the face of the person being screened. Transmission X-ray scanners claim to be more privacy neutral as there is almost no way to distinguish a person but they also have a software able to hide privacy issues.

History
The first (ultra-low-dose backscatter X-ray) full body security scanner was developed by Dr. Steven W Smith, who developed the Secure 1000 whole body scanner in 1992. He subsequently sold the device and associated patents to Rapiscan Systems, who now manufacture and distribute the device.

Safety aspects of the Secure 1000 have been assessed in the US by the Food and Drug Administration, the National Council on Radiation Protection and Measurements and other independent sources since the early 1990s.

In 2000 Dr. Vladimir V. Linev within ADANI patented a system for scanning a person, based on transmission (penetrating) X-ray technology, focused on the search for unwanted objects and contraband which was then the base for CONPASS body scanner marketed later.

The first millimeter-wave full body scanner was developed at the Pacific Northwest National Laboratory (PNNL) in Richland, Washington.  The operation is one of the four national laboratories Battelle manages for the U.S. Department of Energy.  In the 1990s, they patented their 3-D holographic-imagery technology, with research and development support provided by the TSA and the Federal Aviation Administration (FAA).  In 2002, Silicon Valley startup SafeView, Inc. obtained an exclusive license to PNNL's (background) intellectual property, to commercialize their technology. From 2002 to 2006, SafeView developed a production-ready millimeter body scanner system, and software which included scanner control, algorithms for threat detection and object recognition, as well as techniques to conceal raw images in order to resolve privacy concerns.  During this time, SafeView developed foreground IP through several patent applications.  By 2006, SafeView's body scanning portals had been installed and trialed at various locations around the globe.  They were installed at border crossings in Israel, international airports such as Mexico City and Amsterdam's Schiphol, ferry landings in Singapore, railway stations in the UK, government buildings like The Hague, and commercial buildings in Tokyo.  They were also employed to secure soldiers and workers in Iraq's Green Zone.  In 2006, SafeView was acquired by L-3 Communications. From 2006 and 2020, L-3 Communications (later L3Harris) continued to make incremental enhancements to their scanner systems, while deploying thousands of units worldwide.  In 2020, Leidos acquired L3Harris, which included their body scanner business unit.

The first passive, non-radiating full body screening camera device was developed by Lockheed Martin through a sponsorship by the National Institute of Justice (NIJ)'s Office of Science and Technology and the United States Air Force Research Laboratory. Proof of concept was conducted in 1995 through the Defense Advanced Research Projects Agency (DARPA). Rights to this technology were subsequently acquired by Brijot Imaging Systems, who further matured a commercial-grade product line and now manufacture, market and support the passive millimeter wave camera devices.

Usage

Schiphol in the Netherlands was the first airport in the world to implement SafeView's millimeter-wave body scanner on a large scale after a test with flight personnel the previous year. On May 15, 2007, two of 17 purchased security scans were installed.

The Italian government had planned to install full-body scanners at all airport and train stations throughout the country, but announced in September 2010 plans to remove the scanners from airports, calling them "slow and ineffective".

The European Union currently allows member states to decide whether to implement full body scanners in their countries:

Australia
In Australia the government has decided a no opt-out policy will be enforced in relation to screening at airports. Persons with medical or physical conditions that prevent them from undertaking a body scan will be offered alternative screening methods suitable to their circumstances. Infants and young children under 140 cm will not be selected to undergo a body scan. 
Body-scanners are being used at eight of Australia's international airports – Adelaide, Brisbane, Cairns, Darwin, Gold Coast, Melbourne, Perth and Sydney. So far only passengers exiting via international flights are affected. Domestic and international passengers departing Newcastle Port Stephens airport have been subject to body scanning since October 2019. Passengers who refuse a scan may be banned from flying. The scanners proposed to be used in Australia have shown a high rate of error in testing. Public outrage over the nude images created by the body scanners being collected by policy resulted in a lawsuit in 2010 to stop body scanning.

Canada
In Canada, 24 airports currently have these scanners in use, using millimeter-wave technology.  Transport Canada notes that "Passengers selected for a secondary search can choose between the full body scanner or a physical search."

United States
In the U.S. full-body scanners have been installed at train stations, subways, penitentiaries and airports.

After having previously used X-ray-based scanners the TSA currently uses Millimeter Wave AIT scanners exclusively, which show no identifying characteristics of the person being scanned. Instead, a generic outline of a person is used. As of December 2015, "While passengers may generally decline AIT screening in favor of physical screening, TSA may direct mandatory AIT screening for some passengers as warranted by security considerations in order to safeguard transportation security."

Regarding privacy concerns the Transportation Security Administration (TSA) has stated in 2010 they "[have] not, will not and the machines cannot store images of passengers at airports". However the TSA later disclosed, in a response to the house chair on homeland security, that its procurement of airport scanners requires manufacturers to include image storage and transmission features but that these features should be disabled before being placed in an airport. The TSA shows 45 individuals have the ability to turn these machines into 'test mode' which enables recording images, but states that they would never do this on a production system. The US Marshal Service did operate a backscatter machine in a courthouse which records images. However, in a statement they noted that only individuals involved in a test were recorded. A sample of these images was received and disseminated by Gizmodo in 2010, using a Freedom Of Information Request. It is not clear if the US Marshal service has put these new scanning machines, that have recording capabilities, into production. The analyst is in a different room and is not supposed to be able to see the person being scanned by the Backscatter X-ray AIT, but is in contact with other officials who can halt the scanned person if anything suspicious shows up on the scan.

US Penitentiary is also constantly purchasing X-ray full body scanners for contraband and weapons detection purposes. The scanners are generally Transmission X-ray scanners since these are the only devices capable of detecting metallic and non-metallic contraband hidden underneath clothing as well as contraband hidden inside body cavities.

United Kingdom
Civil rights groups in Britain in 2010 argued that the body scanning of children contravened the law relating to child pornography.

Passive infra-red scanners have been developed for use in public spaces to collect and analyse natural heat radiation given off by the human body to detect both metallic and non-metallic "threat objects". No external radiation source is used and privacy is preserved as no body details are revealed. Police are conducting a trial of the equipment at London rail stations.

Asia Pacific 
During the forecast period of 2020–2025, the Asia–Pacific region is projected to grow at the highest market CAGR (Compound Annual Growth Rate). The growth of this region is possibly due to the high airport investments and improvements in prison systems. China and India are heavily investing in greenfield airport construction. In January 2020, the Indian government decided to equip 84 airports with full-body scanners, which has led the Indian market to grow at a higher rate.

Controversies

Privacy
Some argue that using a full-body scanner is equivalent to a strip search, and if used without probable cause violates basic human rights.

Full-body scanning allows screeners to see the surface of the skin under clothing, prosthetics including breast prostheses and prosthetic testicles, which may require a potentially embarrassing, physical inspection once detected. The scanners can also detect other medical equipment normally hidden, such as colostomy bags and catheters. The transgender community also has privacy concerns that body scanners could lead to their harassment.

In the UK, in 2010, the Equality and Human Rights Commission argued that full-body scanners were a risk to human rights and might be breaking the law.

A ruling of the European Council in 2013 required that persons analyzing the image shall be in a separate location and the image shall not be linked to the screened person.

In 2010 the National Human Rights Commission of Korea opposed the use of full-body scanners and recommended that they not be deployed at airports.

Opponents in the US argue that full body scanners and the new TSA patdowns are unconstitutional. A comprehensive student note came out in the Fall 2010 issue of the University of Denver Transportation Law Journal arguing that full-body scanners are unconstitutional in the United States because they are (1) too invasive and (2) not effective enough because the process is too inefficient.

On July 2, 2010, the Electronic Privacy Information Center (EPIC) filed a lawsuit to suspend the deployment of full-body scanners at airports in the United States:

EPIC claimed at that time that full-body scanners violated the Fourth Amendment to the United States Constitution because they subject citizens to a virtual strip search without any evidence of wrongdoing.

The American Civil Liberties Union, in 2006, called the machines an invasion of privacy: "This doesn't only concern genitals but body size, body shape and other things like evidence of mastectomies, colostomy appliances or catheter tubes. These are very personal things that people have every right to keep private and personal, aside from the modesty consideration of not wanting to be naked."

In Idaho a bill was introduced in 2011 to prevent the use of full-body scanners as a primary screening method and allow people to request an alternative.

Travelers at U.S. airports have complained that when they opted not to be scanned, they were subjected to a new type of invasive pat-down that one traveler in 2010 described as "probing and pushing ... in my genital area." Another traveler in the United States complained in 2010 that the TSA employee "inserted four fingers of both hands inside my trousers and ran his fingers all the way around my waist, his fingers extending at least 2–3 inches below my waistline."

As of December 15, 2015 the TSA published a new policy which required AIT to be "mandatory" for "some" passengers for "security reasons". However, most individuals in the US can still opt out of the scanner and choose a pat-down if they are uncomfortable going through the scanner. Individuals also have the right to be patted down in a private room and have it witnessed by a person of the individual's choice.

In November 2010, a female traveler who opted out of a full body scan at Fort Lauderdale International Airport claimed that TSA agents handcuffed her to a chair and ripped up her plane ticket when she asked questions about the new type of invasive pat down she was about to receive. In response, the TSA posted parts of the security camera footage on their blog, though there is no sound in the video and the passenger is not directly in the camera during most of the incident.

In the United States, in 2010 the TSA required that their full-body scanners "allow exporting of image data in real time", and cases of the government's storing of images have been confirmed.

In August 2010, it was reported that the United States Marshals Service saved thousands of images from a millimeter wave scanner. TSA – part of the Department of Homeland Security – reiterated that its own scanners do not save images and that the scanners do not have the capability to save images when they are installed in airports. However, these statements contradict the TSA's own Procurement Specs which specifically require that the machines have the ability to record and transmit images, even if those features might be initially turned off on delivery. Opponents have also expressed skepticism that if there were a successful terror attack that the machines could not save images for later inspection to find out what went wrong with the scans. On November 16, 2010, 100 of the stored 35,000 body scan images were leaked online and posted by Gizmodo.

In February 2012 airport employees in Lagos were allegedly discovered wandering away from a cubicle located in a hidden corner on the right side of the screening area to where the 3D full-body scanner monitors are located.
At the Dallas Ft. Worth International Airport, TSA complaints have been reported to disproportionally stem from women who felt that they were singled out for repeated screening for the entertainment of male security officers.

Treatment of minorities
Current backscatter and millimeter wave scanners installed by the TSA are unable to screen adequately for security threats inside turbans, hijab, burqas, casts, prosthetics and loose clothing. This technology limitation of current scanners often requires these persons to undergo additional screening by hand or other methods and can cause additional delay or feelings of harassment.

According to a manufacturer of the machines, the next generation of backscatter scanners will be able to screen all types of clothing. These improved scanners have been designed to equalize the screening process for religious minorities.

Currently the transmission (penetrating) X-ray technology is the only way to detect hidden objects inside prosthetic devices and other hiding criteria of the same type.

Treatment of transgender people
Current machines installed by the TSA require agents in the US to designate each passenger as either male or female, after which the software compares the passenger's body against a normative body of that sex. Transgender passengers have reported that full body scanners at several U.S. airports have falsely raised alarms based on their anatomy.

Health concerns
Health concerns relating to the use of full-body scanning technology are present, especially pertaining to the use of X-ray scanners. The issue is mainly regulated by ANSI 43.17.2009, which limits the dose on a per-person basis. However this 2010-era document is intended to apply primarily in the context of standard civilian-airport security. It is generally not considered applicable to unusual terrorism-threat detection concerns in high-security environments (prisons, special-purpose airports) or military institutions. Nor is ANSI 43.17.2009 considered to be the appropriate standard for highly concealed threats such liquid bombs inside body cavities or swallowed drugs.  Due to fundamental physical limitations of how each type of detection technology functions, these highly covert types of threats are impossible to detect by any means other than transmission X-rays.

From the perspective of annual dosage, the ANSI 43.17.2009 standard stipulates that a transmission X-ray dosage of 0.25 μSv per scan, in conjunction with an annual total limit at 250 µSv, equates to a per-person maximum of such 1000 scans per year for a civilian-aviation passenger.  However, counting all medical X-ray procedures (as a typical person might undergo in an average year), and if the total annual dose of 250 µSv is taken to include all medical-related doses, then the number of flights/scans permitted for that person could be greatly reduced, assuming that transmission-type X-ray technology is used at each security screening that the civil-aviation passenger undergoes.  But because the medical X-ray dosages vary tremendously (over several orders of magnitude) depending on the diagnostic procedures that the patient is subjected to, the proportional contribution of airport-security X-raying to the person's total annual dosage cannot be calculated unless an accounting of the medical X-ray dosages is also present.

Millimeter wave scanners

Currently adopted millimeter wave scanners operate in the millimeter or sub-terahertz band, using non-ionizing radiation, and have no proven adverse health effects, though no long-term studies have been done. Thomas S. Tenforde, president of the National Council on Radiation Protection and Measurements, said in 2010 that millimeter wave scanners are probably within bounds [of standards for safe operation], but there should be an effort to verify that they are safe for frequent use. WHO (World Health Organization) in 2011 categorized RF (radio frequency) radiation as a possible carcinogen.

Numerical simulations of terahertz radiation, which active millimeter-wave scanners do not operate at, have produced mixed results. Researchers at the Center for Nonlinear Studies at Los Alamos National Laboratory in New Mexico have used simulations to show a way that terahertz radiation may affect DNA, However, this has not been verified.

Backscatter X-ray scanners
In the United States, the FAA Modernization and Reform Act of 2012 required that all full-body scanners operated in airports by the Transportation Security Administration use "Automated Target Recognition" software, which replaces the picture of a nude body with the cartoon-like representation.  As a result of this law, all backscatter X-ray machines formerly in use by the Transportation Security Administration were removed from airports by May 2013, since the agency said the vendor (Rapiscan) did not meet their contractual deadline to implement the software.

In the European Union, backscatter X-ray screening of airline passengers was banned in 2012 to protect passenger safety, and the deployment at Manchester Airport was removed.

Several radiation safety authorities including the National Council on Radiation Protection and Measurements, The Health Physics Society, and the American College of Radiology, have stated that they are "not aware of any evidence" that full-body scans are unsafe. However, other radiation authorities, including the International Atomic Energy Agency and Nuclear Energy Agency recommend against using ionizing radiation on certain populations like pregnant women and children, and opponents of the devices say that no long-term studies have been done on the health effects of either backscatter X-ray or millimeter wave scanners: "I don't think the right questions have been asked. We don't have enough information to make a decision on whether there's going to be a biological effect or not". (Douglas Boreham, professor in Medical Physics and Applied Radiation Sciences at McMaster University in Hamilton, Ontario.)

Richard Morin, a medical physicist at the Mayo Clinic has said that he is not concerned about health effects from backscatter X-ray scanners: "From a radiation standpoint there has been no evidence that there is really any untoward effect from the use of this device [backscatter scanner], so I would not be concerned about it from a radiation dose standpoint – the issues of personal privacy are a different thing". The health effects of the more common millimeter wave scanner are largely unknown, and at least one expert believes a safety study is warranted. "I am very interested in performing a National Council on Radiation Protection and Measurements study on the use of millimeter-wave security screening systems", said Thomas S. Tenforde, council president. However, no long-term studies have been done on the health effects of millimeter wave scanners.

Perhaps the most notable and debated professional opinion in regard to the safety of scanners is the so-called "Holdren Letter" from a number of world-renowned biochemists and biophysics researchers from the University of California to the Assistant to the US President for Science and Technology, Dr. John P. Holdren. The opening paragraph of their letter of concern reads: "We, a number of University of California, San Francisco faculty, are writing—see attached memo—to call your attention to our concerns about the potential serious health risks of the recently adopted whole body back scatter X-ray airport security scanners. This is an urgent situation as these X-ray scanners are rapidly being implemented as a primary screening step for all air travel passengers."

Critics of backscatter X-ray scanners, including the head of the Center for Radiological Research at Columbia University, say that the radiation emitted by some full-body scanners is as much as 20 times stronger than officially reported and is not safe to use on large numbers of persons because of an increased risk of cancer to children and at-risk populations.
Researchers at the University of California, San Francisco, (UCSF) have argued that the amount of radiation is higher than claimed by the TSA and body scanner manufacturers because the doses were calculated as if distributed throughout the whole body, but the radiation from backscatter X-ray scanners is focused on just the skin and surrounding tissues:

The majority of [the scanners'] energy is delivered to the skin and the underlying tissue. Thus, while the dose would be safe if it were distributed throughout the volume of the entire body, the dose to the skin may be dangerously high.

The X-ray dose from these devices has often been compared in the media to the cosmic ray exposure inherent to airplane travel or that of a chest X-ray. However, this comparison is very misleading: both the air travel cosmic ray exposure and chest X- rays have much higher X-ray energies and the health consequences are appropriately understood in terms of the whole body volume dose. In contrast, these new airport scanners are largely depositing their energy into the skin and immediately adjacent tissue, and since this is such a small fraction of body weight/vol, possibly by one to two orders of magnitude, the real dose to the skin is now high.

In addition, it appears that real independent safety data do not exist. A search, ultimately finding top FDA radiation physics staff, suggests that the relevant radiation quantity, the Flux [photons per unit area and time (because this is a scanning device)] has not been characterized. Instead an indirect test (Air Kerma) was made that emphasized the whole body exposure value, and thus it appears that the danger is low when compared to cosmic rays during airplane travel and a chest X-ray dose.

However other professors in the UCSF radiology department disagree, saying that the radiation dose is low. "The conclusions are wrong", Ronald Arenson, professor of radiology, tells SF Weekly of his own institution's letter. "People who are totally unrelated to radiation wrote it. ... It was senior faculty at UCSF. They're smart people and well-intended, but their conclusions, I think, were off-base. They don't understand how radiation translates to an actual dose in the human body".

Dr. Steve Smith, inventor of the body scanner in 1991, and president of Tek84, one of the companies that produces the machines, has stated that the concerns of Dr. Brenner and UCSF Scientists regarding the skin dose of backscatter scanners are incorrect. He states the values used for X-ray penetration were incorrectly based on the description of the imaging depth which describes what the instrument sees and is a few mm into the skin and the dosage depth which is deeper. He describes experimental proof that the X-rays have the same properties as any other X-rays and the penetration is correct to be averaged over the whole body. Dr. Smith has provided measured data from an operating body scanner to explain his position.

In October 2010, The TSA responded to the concerns of UCSF researchers via the White House science advisor.

Scanners also concentrate the dose in time, because they deliver a high dose-rate at the moment of exposure. High dose-rate exposure has been shown to cause greater damage than the same radiation dose delivered at lower rates. This raises further questions about comparisons to background radiation.

The FDA report states:

Since general-use x-ray systems emit ionizing radiation, the societal benefit of reliably detecting threats must be sufficient to outweigh the potential radiation risk, if any, to the individual screened. The dose from one screening with a general-use x-ray security screening system is so low that it presents an extremely small risk to any individual. To put the radiation dose received into perspective:
 Naturally occurring ionizing radiation is all around us. We are continuously exposed to this background radiation during ordinary living. In 42 minutes of ordinary living, a person receives more radiation from naturally occurring sources than from screening with any general-use x-ray security system.
 The national radiation safety standard (see below) sets a dose per screening limit for the general-use category. To meet the requirements of the general-use category a full-body x-ray security system must deliver less than the dose a person receives during 4 minutes of airline flight. TSA has set their dose limit to ensure a person receives less radiation from one scan with a TSA general-use x-ray security system than from 2 minutes of airline flight.
 A person would have to be screened more than a thousand times in one year in order to exceed the annual radiation dose limit for people screening that has been set by expert radiation safety organizations (see below).
 Millimeter wave security systems which comply with the limits set in the applicable national non-ionizing radiation safety standard (see below) cause no known adverse health effects.

The U.S. TSA has also made public various independent safety assessments of the Secure 1000 Backscatter X-ray Scanner.

Dr. David Brenner, head of Columbia University's center for radiological research, said although the danger posed to the individual passenger is "very low", he is urging researchers to carry out more tests on the device to look at the way it affects specific groups who could be more sensitive to radiation.

Dr. Andrew J. Einstein, director of cardiac CT research at Columbia University, has made the following statements in support of the safety of body scanners: "A passenger would need to be scanned using a backscatter scanner, from both the front and the back, about 200,000 times to receive the amount of radiation equal to one typical CT scan ... Another way to look at this is that if you were scanned with a backscatter scanner every day of your life, you would still only receive a tenth of the dose of a typical CT scan ... By comparison, the amount of radiation from a backscatter scanner is equivalent to about 10 minutes of natural background radiation in the United States ... I believe that the general public has nothing to worry about in terms of the radiation from airline scanning ... For moms-to-be, no evidence supports an increased risk of miscarriage or fetal abnormalities from these scanners ... A pregnant woman will receive much more radiation from cosmic rays she is exposed to while flying than from passing through a scanner in the airport".

In May 2010 the National Council on Radiation Protection and Measurements issued a press release in response to the health risk claims from UCSF and Columbia University (claims of excessive skin dose and risks to large populations vs. individuals). The NCRP claims that cancer risks cited by opponents are completely inaccurate, stating that:

 the summation of trivial average risks over very large populations or time periods into a single value produces a distorted image of risk, completely out of perspective with risks accepted every day, both voluntarily and involuntarily.

and that

general-use systems should adhere to an effective dose of 0.1 microsievert (μSv) (0.01 millirem) or less per scan, and can be used mostly without regard to the number of individuals scanned or the number of scans per individual in a year. An effective dose of 0.1 μSv (0.01 mrem) per scan would allow 2,500 scans of an individual annually [i.e., if each scan required 0.1 μSv (0.01 mrem)] without exceeding the administrative control of 0.25 mSv (25 mrem) to a member of the general public for a single source or set of sources under one control. Assuming 250 workdays per year, this would correspond to an average of 10 scans each day, a frequency that is unlikely to be encountered.

All the same the Inter-Agency Committee on Radiation Safety which includes the International Atomic Energy Agency, Nuclear Energy Agency and the World Health Organization, reported that, "Pregnant women and children should not be subject to scanning, even though the radiation dose from body scanners is 'extremely small'".

It has also been suggested that defects in the machines, damage from normal wear-and-tear, or software errors could focus an intense dose of radiation on just one spot of the body. The researchers write:

Moreover, there are a number of 'red flags' related to the hardware itself. Because this device can scan a human in a few seconds, the X-ray beam is very intense. Any glitch in power at any point in the hardware (or more importantly in software) that stops the device could cause an intense radiation dose to a single spot on the skin. Who will oversee problems with overall dose after repair or software problems? The TSA is already complaining about resolution limitations; who will keep the manufacturers and/or TSA from just raising the dose, an easy way to improve signal-to-noise and get higher resolution? Lastly, given the recent incident (on December 25th), how do we know whether the manufacturer or TSA, seeking higher resolution, will scan the groin area more slowly leading to a much higher total dose?

Proponents of backscatter X-ray scanners argue that the ANSI N43.17 standard addresses safety requirements and engineering design of the systems to prevent the occurrence of accidental high radiation due to defects and errors in hardware and software. Safety requirements include "fail-safe" controls, multiple overlapping interlocks and engineering design to ensure that failure of any systems result in safe or non-operation of the system to reduce the chance of accidental exposures. Furthermore, TSA requires that certification to the ANSI N43.17 standard is performed by a third party and not by the manufacturer themselves. But there are cases where types of medical scanning machines, operated by trained medical personnel, have malfunctioned, causing serious injury to patients that were scanned. Critics of full-body scanners cite these incidents as examples of how radiation-based scanning machines can overdose people with radiation despite all safety precautions.

In March 2011, it was found that some of the full body scanners in the US were emitting 10 times the normal level of radiation: Contractors charged with routinely examining the scanners submitted reports containing discrepancies, including mathematical miscalculations showing that some of the devices emitted radiation levels 10 times higher than normal:Peter Kant, executive vice president of Rapiscan Systems, said that "In our review of the surveys we found instances where a technician incorrectly did his math and came up with results that showed the radiation readings were off by a factor of 10".
 
The X-rays from backscatter scanners "are a form of ionizing radiation, that is, radiation powerful enough to strip molecules in the body of their electrons, creating charged particles that cause cell damage and are thought to be the mechanism through which radiation causes cancer." Humans are exposed to background radiation every day, anywhere on earth, and proponents of backscatter X-ray scanners say that the devices expose subjects to levels of radiation equivalent to background radiation. Furthermore, when traveling on an airplane, passengers are exposed to much higher levels of radiation than on earth due to altitude. Proponents say that a backscatter X-ray scan is equivalent to the radiation received during two minutes of flying.

The UK Health Protection Agency has also issued a statement that the radiation dose from backscatter scanners is very low and "about the same as one hour of background radiation".

The European Commission issued a report stating that backscatter X-ray scanners pose no known health risk, but suggested that backscatter X-ray scanners, which expose people to ionizing radiation, should not be used when millimeter-wave scanners that "have less effects on the human body" are available.

Assuming all other conditions equal, there is no reason to adopt X‐ray backscatters, which expose the subject to an additional – although negligible – source of ionizing radiations. Other WBI (Whole Body Imaging) technologies should be preferred for standard use. However, the European Commission's report provides no data substantiating the claim that "all other conditions are equal". One area where backscatter X-ray scanners can provide better performance than millimeter wave scanners, for example, is in the inspection of the shoes, groin and armpit regions of the body. The European Commission also recommended that alternate screening methods should be "used on pregnant women, babies, children and people with disabilities".

In the United States, Senator Susan Collins, Ranking Member of the Senate Homeland Security Committee sent a letter on August 6, 2010, to the Secretary of Homeland Security and Administrator of the TSA, requesting that the TSA "have the Department's Chief Medical Officer, working with independent experts, conduct a review of the health effects of their use for travelers, TSA employees, and airport and airline personnel." The TSA has completed this review.

The U.S. government is also supplying higher-radiation through-body X-ray machines to at least two African countries "for the purposes of airport security – the kind that can see through flesh, and which deliver real doses of radiation. The U.S.-supplied scanners have apparently been deployed at one airport in Ghana and four in Nigeria". This has caused some to question how far the U.S. government intends to go with the technology.

Unions for airline pilots working for American Airlines and US Airways have urged pilots to avoid the full body scanners.

Child scanning
There is controversy over full-body scanners in some countries because the machines create images of virtual strip searches on persons under the age of 18 which may violate child pornography laws. In the UK, the scanners may be breaking the Protection of Children Act of 1978 by creating images or pseudo-images of nude children.

Parents have complained that their young children are being virtually strip searched, sometimes without their parents present.

Ineffectiveness

Backscatter and millimeter 
Some critics suggest that full-body scanner technology is ineffective for multiple reasons, including that they can easily be bypassed and a study published in the November 2010 edition of the Journal of Transportation Security suggested terrorists might fool the Rapiscan machines and others like it employing the X-ray "backscatter" technique. A terrorist, the report found, could tape a thin film of explosives of about 15–20 centimeters in diameter to the stomach and walk through the machine undetected.

Terrorists have already evolved their tactics with the use of surgically implanted bombs or bombs hidden in body cavities.

In March 2012, scientist and blogger Jonathan Corbett demonstrated the ineffectiveness of the machines by publishing a viral video showing how he was able to get a metal box through backscatter X-ray and millimeter wave scanners in two US airports. In April 2012, Corbett released a second video interviewing a TSA screener, who described firearms and simulated explosives passing through the scanners during internal testing and training. In another test of the full-body scanners, the machines failed to detect bomb parts hidden around a person's body. And in a different test in 2011, an undercover TSA agent was able to carry a handgun through full body scanners multiple times without the weapon being detected. However, in this case, the TSA agent who was in charge of viewing the scanned images was simply not paying attention.

Furthermore, an Israeli airport security expert, Rafi Sela, who helped design security at Ben Gurion International Airport, has said: "I don't know why everybody is running to buy these expensive and useless machines. I can overcome the body scanners with enough explosives to bring down a Boeing 747... That's why we haven't put them in our airport."

Again, despite the scanners, the TSA has been unable to stop weapons like box cutters and pistols from being carried onto airplanes.

The Australia government has been challenged over the effectiveness and cost of full body scanners by public media to which Australian Transport Minister Anthony Albanese has said he "makes no apologies" for mandating the installation of full body scanners at Australian airports.

Two alternatives that have been argued for by experts, such as Prof Chris Mayhew from Birmingham University, are chemical-based scanners and bomb-sniffing dogs. Others have argued that passenger profiling, as done by Israeli airport security, should replace full body scanners and patdowns.

Transmission (penetrating) 

Unlike the above, transmission technology allows to detect objects swallowed or hidden inside the objects. This is the main reason it is commonly used in prisons and jails. However the current technology does not allow the dual-energy body scanning (and detecting the object by its atomic number like it is used in baggage or vehicle X-ray scanners) which could give the image the same detection effectiveness as regular black and white X-ray. This leads to the idea that human-held detection (finding threats by looking at the image and finding non-common to the human body items) is the most effective way to find a contraband. However counting a human factor (fatigue, decreased attention) threats still could be missed. Modern software based on Artificial Intelligence in full body scanners is designed to minimize human faults and rise the detection effectiveness of this method.

US public opinion
A Gallup poll given just after the 2009 Christmas Day bombing attempt suggested that 78% of American airline travelers approved of body scanners while 20% disapproved. 51% indicated that they would have some level of discomfort with full-body scans, while 48% said they would not be uncomfortable with the idea. The poll was given in the context of the 2009 Christmas Day bombing attempt, and some opponents of full body scanners say that the explosives used in that bombing attempt would not have been detected by full-body scanners.

An ABC/Washington Post poll conducted by Langer Associates and released November 22, 2010, found that 64 percent of Americans favored the full-body X-ray scanners, but that 50 percent think the "enhanced" pat-downs go too far; 37 percent felt so strongly. In addition the poll states opposition is lowest amongst those who fly less than once a year.

As of November 23, 2010 an online poll of 11,817 people on The Consumerist website, 59.41% said they would not fly as a result of the new scans. Additionally, as of November 23, 2010, a poll of MSNBC 8,500 online readers indicated 84.1% believe the new procedures would not increase travel safety. According to a CBS telephone poll of 1,137 people published in November 2010, 81% (+/- 5%) percent of those polled approved TSA's use of full-body scans.

There has been some debate about the safety of the scanners, however, the TSA argue that mmw scanners used emit no ionizing radiation.

Full-body scanner lobbyists
Former Homeland Security secretary Michael Chertoff has been criticized for heavily promoting full-body scanners while not always fully disclosing that he is a lobbyist for one of the companies that makes the machines. Other full-body scanner lobbyists with government connections include:

 former TSA deputy administrator Tom Blank
 former assistant administrator for policy at the TSA, Chad Wolf
 Kevin Patrick Kelly, "a former top staffer to Sen. Barbara Mikulski, D-Md., who sits on the Homeland Security Appropriations subcommittee"
 Former Senator Al D'Amato

TSA's expansion of scanning program
Forbes magazine reported, in March 2011, that:

Newly uncovered documents show that as early as 2008, the Department of Homeland Security has been planning pilot programs to deploy mobile scanning units that can be set up at public events and in train stations, along with mobile x-ray vans capable of scanning pedestrians on city streets.

and that the TSA had research proposals to:

bring full-body scanners to train stations, mass transit, and public events. Contracts included in the EPIC release showed plans to develop long-range scans that could assess what a subject carried from 30 feet away, along with studies that involved systems for x-ray scanners mounted in vans and "covert" scans of pedestrians.

"No nudity" full-body scanner
Millimeter-wave scanner software transitioned to featureless male or female 'cartoons' in 2011, in response to widescale privacy concerns. Opponents of full body scanners still consider this an unconstitutional strip search, because even though the operator sees only an edited version of the image, a naked image is still captured by the machine, and there is no guarantee the government or a private company will not store it in the case that a terrorist attack were successful.

Currently, the millimeter-wave scanner monitor shows a generic cookie-cutter-like outline of a person and highlights potential threats. It is the same image no matter the individual's gender, height, or body type. The scanner software recognizes metallic and non-metallic items hiding under clothing. The machine then processes an image using yellow boxes to point out any areas that may need additional screening.

TSA Administrator John Pistole stated that "Our top priority is the safety of the traveling public, and TSA constantly strives to explore and implement new technologies that enhance security and strengthen privacy protections for the traveling public ... This software upgrade enables us to continue providing a high level of security through advanced imaging technology screening, while improving the passenger experience at checkpoints."

See also
 3D scanner
 3D body scanning
 Explosives trace-detection portal machine (puffer machine)
 Full-body CT scan (in medical imaging)

References

External links
List of American airports that currently/will use Full Body Scanners in their passenger searches
Challenge to Airport Body Scanners
Alternate ways to screen airport passengers without the need of full body scan
National Outcry Over TSA Body Scanners and Invasive Pat-Downs – video report by Democracy Now!
Details about body scanners
How does an X-ray Baggage Scanner Work?

Measuring instruments
Security technology
Crime prevention
Child welfare
Safety

ksh:Bäckskättr